Rothaniel Jerrod Carmichael (born April 6, 1987) is an American stand-up comedian, actor, writer, and filmmaker. He has released three stand-up comedy specials on HBO: Love at the Store (2014), 8 (2017), and Rothaniel (2022). He also co-created, co-wrote, produced, and starred in the semi autobiographical NBC sitcom The Carmichael Show (2015–2017). Carmichael directed, produced, and starred in On the Count of Three (2021). In 2022, he won a Primetime Emmy Award for writing Rothaniel and was nominated for guest hosting Saturday Night Live that same year.

Early life
Jerrod Carmichael was born in Winston-Salem, North Carolina, on April 6, 1987. He has an older brother named Joe. Jerrod Carmichael grew up poor, which is a frequent topic in his stand-up comedy. In fifth grade, he hosted a morning news show on his elementary school's local access channel. In 2005, he graduated from Robert B. Glenn High School in Kernersville, North Carolina. His early comedic influences were George Carlin, Bill Cosby, Richard Pryor, and Sinbad.

Career 
Carmichael moved to Los Angeles at the age of 20 to pursue his dream of being a stand-up comedian although he had never performed comedy. His first time doing stand-up was at an open mic night at The Comedy Store in West Hollywood. Working his way up through the clubs he appeared in the "New Faces" showcase at the 2011 Just for Laughs Festival in Montreal. He appeared on the show The Goodwin Games (2013) and had his breakout role as an actor in the film Neighbors in 2014. His first HBO stand-up comedy special, Love at the Store (2014), was directed by filmmaker Spike Lee and filmed at The Comedy Store.

Carmichael's second stand-up comedy special, 8 (2017), was directed by comedian Bo Burnham and filmed in the Grand Lodge Room of New York's Masonic Hall. Carmichael next co-created, co-wrote, produced, and starred in the semi-biographical NBC sitcom The Carmichael Show (2015–2017) which was well-received and was notable for pushing the envelope broaching topics including the Black Lives Matter movement, LGBT issues, gun rights, politics, and the reality of being black in America. He also served as an executive producer for the Fox sitcom Rel (2018–2019) and directed Drew Michael's stand-up comedy special Drew Michael in 2018 which was acclaimed for its unusual style. Michael talks directly to the camera in a dark room without an audience; there are also scenes of him in varying degrees of confrontation with an unidentified woman played by English actress Suki Waterhouse.

Carmichael made an appearance on Tyler, the Creator's fifth album IGOR in 2019, narrating the album using short phrases to find logic in the title character Igor's state of mind. In the same year, he was hired by Quentin Tarantino to co-write a film adaptation based on the Django/Zorro crossover comic book series. He created, directed, produced, and starred in the HBO documentaries Home Videos (2019) and Sermon on the Mount (2019) which are autobiographical. He directed and starred in the comedy thriller film On the Count of Three in 2021. His third HBO special, Rothaniel (2022), was also directed by Burnham. Two days after the release of Rothaniel, Carmichael hosted Saturday Night Live for the first time.

Carmichael hosted the 80th Golden Globe Awards.

Personal life
Carmichael lives in New York City. He has discussed his relationships with both men and women during his documentary series Home Videos (2019). He came out as gay in his comedy special Rothaniel (2022).

Filmography

Film

Television

Music videos

Awards and nominations

References

External links

Living people
1987 births
21st-century American male actors
African-American male actors
African-American stand-up comedians
African-American film directors
American gay actors
American stand-up comedians
American male film actors
American male television actors
American male voice actors
American television producers
American film producers
American sketch comedians
American television writers
Gay comedians
LGBT African Americans
American LGBT writers
Male actors from North Carolina
Primetime Emmy Award winners
American male television writers
Writers from Winston-Salem, North Carolina
21st-century American comedians
Screenwriters from North Carolina
21st-century American screenwriters
21st-century American male writers
21st-century African-American writers
20th-century African-American people
African-American male writers
LGBT people from North Carolina
American LGBT comedians